The Nicollet County Courthouse and Jail are historic governmental buildings located at 501 South Minnesota Avenue in St. Peter, Minnesota, United States.

The courthouse was designed in a Romanesque Revival style of architecture by noted St. Paul architects Edward P. Bassford and E. W. Stebbins. Construction  started and was completed in 1881 at a cost of $26,638. Bohn and Wilce of Winona were the builders. Minor extensions and additions were made in 1917 and 1967. In 1978 a $913,512 3-story addition designed by Wick-Kagermeier-Skaar of Mankato was built on the rear side of the building. A March 28, 1998 tornado damaged the building and after repairs it was reopened in June 2000. The next year a 3-year multimillion-dollar extension and renovation began. The building is now called the Nicollet County Government Center.

The jail was designed in a Queen Anne style of architecture by Winona architect Andrew J. Van Deusen. Construction was started in 1906 and completed in 1907 at an estimated cost of about $22,000.

On September 6, 2002, they were added to the National Register of Historic Places

References

Buildings and structures in Nicollet County, Minnesota
County courthouses in Minnesota
County government buildings in Minnesota
Courthouses on the National Register of Historic Places in Minnesota
Government buildings completed in 1881
Jails on the National Register of Historic Places in Minnesota
Queen Anne architecture in Minnesota
Romanesque Revival architecture in Minnesota
National Register of Historic Places in Nicollet County, Minnesota
Jails in Minnesota
1881 establishments in Minnesota